Cardiophysics is an interdisciplinary science that stands at the junction of cardiology and medical physics, with researchers using the methods of, and theories from, physics to study cardiovascular system at different levels of its organisation, from the molecular scale to whole organisms. Being formed historically as part of systems biology, cardiophysics designed to reveal connections between the physical mechanisms, underlying the organization of the cardiovascular system, and biological features of its functioning.

Zbigniew R. Struzik seems to be a first author who used the term in a scientific publication in 2004.

One can use interchangeably also the terms cardiovascular physics.

See also 
 Medical physics
 Important publications in medical physics
 Biomedicine
 Biomedical engineering
 Physiome
 Nanomedicine

References 
 Books
 
 
 
 Papers

External links 
 Bioelectric Information Processing Laboratory of the Institute for Information Transmission Problems RAS.
  The Group of Experimental and Clinical Cardiology in the Laboratory of Physiology of emotion, Research Institute of normal physiology by Anokhin RAMS
 Oxford Cardiac Electrophysiology Group, led many years already by Prof. Denis Noble
 Cardiac Biophysics and Systems Biology group  of National Heart & Lung Institute of Imperial College London
  Group of Nonlinear Dynamics & Cardiovascular Physics of the 1st Faculty of Mathematics and Natural Sciences in the Institute of Physics of Humboldt University of Berlin

Medical physics

 
Applied and interdisciplinary physics